Lion's Gate is the developmental branch of professional wrestling promotion New Japan Pro-Wrestling (NJPW), which holds events under the banner of Lion's Gate Project. The branch was officially announced on July 18, 2015, and held its first show on February 25, 2016. In addition to NJPW wrestlers, the Lion's Gate Project shows also feature wrestlers from other promotions, resulting in unique cards.

The events are held at Tokyo's Shinjuku Face. The first three shows featured heavy participation from wrestlers from the Pro Wrestling Noah promotion. Wrestlers from promotions such as All Japan Pro Wrestling (AJPW), Big Japan Pro Wrestling (BJW) and Kaientai Dojo (K-Dojo) have also taken part in the project. NJPW rookies Takumi Honjo, Shota Umino, Tetsuhiro Yagi and Ren Narita have made their official debuts at Lion's Gate Project shows, while Katsuya Kitamura and Tomoyuki Oka wrestled their unofficial debuts as part of the project.

History
On July 18, 2015, NJPW held a press conference on various items relating to the future of the promotion. One of these was the establishment of a developmental branch, where NJPW could discover and develop both Japanese and foreign wrestlers. It was also intended as a place where trials could be held for outside wrestlers and where injured wrestlers could go to get back in shape. The plan was for the branch to eventually start running its own small shows. The project quickly drew comparisons to WWE's NXT developmental branch. NJPW had earlier attempted a developmental branch with a project named NEVER, which held shows between 2010 and 2012.

Recently, NJPW had been described as "lax in cultivation of new talent", however, on January 3, 2016, the promotion introduced four new wrestlers with Hirai Kawato and Teruaki Kanemitsu wrestling their debut matches, while Katsuya Kitamura and Tomoyuki Oka were announced as the two newest recruits to the NJPW dojo. Dave Meltzer called the recruitment of the two former top amateur wrestlers "[p]robably the biggest move in a couple of years when it comes to new talent". The same day, NJPW announced that their developmental branch Lion's Gate would be holding its first show on February 25, 2016, in Tokyo's Shinjuku Face.

Events

Lion's Gate Project 1

The first Lion's Gate Project event was held on February 25, 2016, in Tokyo at Shinjuku Face. The event featured ten matches, including one dark match, an "exhibition match" featuring the unofficial debuts of Katsuya Kitamura and Tomoyuki Oka, working under amateur wrestling rules. The other nine matches featured NJPW wrestlers taking on Pro Wrestling Noah wrestlers. The second match saw the debut of Animal Hamaguchi trainee Takumi Honjo, who was defeated by Noah's Maybach Taniguchi. The show was main evented by NJPW veteran Yuji Nagata defeating Noah's Mitsuhiro Kitamiya.

Lion's Gate Project 2

The second Lion's Gate Project event was held on May 19, 2016, in Tokyo at Shinjuku Face. Much like the first Lion's Gate Project show, the event featured several wrestlers from Pro Wrestling Noah as well as Ayato Yoshida from Kaientai Dojo (K-Dojo). All in all, the event featured eight matches.

Lion's Gate Project 3

The third Lion's Gate Project event was held on September 1, 2016, in Tokyo at Shinjuku Face. The event featured nine matches, including one dark match, and again featured heavy participation from Pro Wrestling Noah. One of the matches saw the NJPW debut of the promotion's newest international trainee, Henare, who was defeated by Noah's Quiet Storm. In addition to the NJPW and Noah wrestlers, the event featured Ayato Yoshida and Go Asakawa from Kaientai Dojo (K-Dojo). The dark match featured another exhibition match between NJPW trainees Katsuya Kitamura and Tomoyuki Oka, this time worked under professional wrestling rules.

Lion's Gate Project 4

The fourth Lion's Gate Project event was held on April 13, 2017, in Tokyo at Shinjuku Face. The event featured six matches, including the debut match of Shota Umino, son of NJPW referee Red Shoes Unno. Unno refereed the match, where his son was defeated by Taka Michinoku. Following the dissolution of the partnership between NJPW and Pro Wrestling Noah at the end of 2016, this was the first Lion's Gate Project show not to feature any wrestlers from Noah, instead Ayato Yoshida and Dinosaur Takuma from Kaientai Dojo (K-Dojo), Koji Iwamoto and Yuma Aoyagi from All Japan Pro Wrestling (AJPW) and Toru Sugiura from Pro Wrestling Freedoms took part in the event as outsiders.

Lion's Gate Project 5

The fifth Lion's Gate Project event was held on May 9, 2017, in Tokyo at Shinjuku Face. The event featured six matches, including the debut of Tetsuhiro Yagi in the opening match. Outsiders taking part in the event included Ayato Yoshida and Dinosaur Takuma from Kaientai Dojo, Daisuke Kanehira from Pro Wrestling Heat Up and Toru Sugiura from Pro Wrestling Fredoms. In the main event of the show, the veteran duo of Manabu Nakanishi and Yuji Nagata were victorious over the rookie team of Katsuya Kitamura and Tomoyuki Oka in what marked Nagata's fifth straight main event win as part of Lion's Gate Project.

Lion's Gate Project 6

The sixth Lion's Gate Project event was held on June 15, 2017, in Tokyo at Shinjuku Face. The event featured six matches and outside participation from Ayato Yoshida and Dinosaur Takuma from Kaientai Dojo (K-Dojo), Takuya Nomura from Big Japan Pro Wrestling (BJW) and Yuma Aoyagi from All Japan Pro Wrestling (AJPW).

Lion's Gate Project 7

The seventh Lion's Gate Project event was held on July 4, 2017, in Tokyo at Shinjuku Face. The event featured seven matches, including the debut of Ren Narita in the opening match. Outsiders taking part in the event included Dinosaur Takuma and Go Asakawa from Kaientai Dojo (K-Dojo), Koji Iwamoto from All Japan Pro Wrestling (AJPW) and freelancer Dick Togo, who made his first NJPW appearance since 2011. Following the main event of the show, Yuji Nagata, seeing the recent influx of new talent into NJPW, proposed bringing back the Young Lion Cup for the first time in 12 years.

Lion's Gate Project 8

The eighth Lion's Gate Project event was held on October 12, 2017, in Tokyo at Shinjuku Face. The event featured six matches, including the first three matches of the 2017 Young Lion Cup. NJPW announced on September 26 that it was bringing back the tournament for the first time in 12 years and dedicating it to the memory of Kotetsu Yamamoto, the former head of the NJPW dojo. The round-robin tournament would feature six NJPW rookies who debuted in 2016 and 2017. Non-tournament matches featured outside participation from Daisuke Kanehira from Pro Wrestling Heat Up, Go Asakawa and Kotaro Yoshino from Kaientai Dojo (K-Dojo) and Yuma Aoyagi from All Japan Pro Wrestling (AJPW).

Lion's Gate Project 9

The ninth Lion's Gate Project event was held on November 16, 2017, in Tokyo at Shinjuku Face. The event featured six matches, including the continuation of the 2017 Young Lion Cup. Non-tournament matches featured outside participation from Daisuke Kanehira from Pro Wrestling Heat Up, Go Asakawa and the tag team Dino Stones (Dinosaur Takuma and Kotaro Yoshino) from Kaientai Dojo (K-Dojo) and Yuma Aoyagi from All Japan Pro Wrestling (AJPW).

Lion's Gate Project 10

The tenth Lion's Gate Project event was held on December 21, 2017, in Tokyo at Shinjuku Face. The event featured six matches, including the conclusion of the 2017 Young Lion Cup with its three final matches. Katsuya Kitamura won the tournament with a clean record of five wins and zero losses. Non-tournament matches featured outside participation from Daisuke Kanehira from Pro Wrestling Heat Up, Dinosaur Takuma and Kotaro Yoshino from Kaientai Dojo (K-Dojo) and Yuma Aoyagi from All Japan Pro Wrestling (AJPW).

Lion's Gate Project 11

The eleventh Lion's Gate Project event was held on April 10, 2018, in Tokyo at Shinjuku Face. The event featured five matches. Two new rookies wrestled their debut match: Yuya Uemura and Yota Tsuji. Some matches featured outside participation: Manjimaru and Ken45°, from Michinoku Pro Wrestling, made their New Japan Pro-Wrestling debut and Ayato Yoshida and Go Asakawa made their return, from Kaientai Dojo (K-Dojo).

Lion's Gate Project 12

The twelfth Lion's Gate Project event was held on May 15, 2018, in Tokyo at Shinjuku Face. Some matches featured outside participation: Daisuke Sekimoto from Big Japan Pro Wrestling and Ayato Yoshida from Kaientai Dojo (K-Dojo). The main event was a previously postponed one-on-one match between Yoshida and Yuji Nagata.

Lion's Gate Project 13

The thirteenth Lion's Gate Project event was held on June 13, 2018, in Tokyo at Shinjuku Face. Some matches featured outside participation: Shunsuke Sayama, from Asuka Project, who made his New Japan Pro-Wrestling debut, and Dinosaur Takuma and Ayato Yoshida from Kaientai Dojo (K-Dojo).

See also
New Japan Pro-Wrestling
NEVER

References

External links
The official New Japan Pro-Wrestling website

New Japan Pro-Wrestling shows
2016 in professional wrestling
2017 in professional wrestling
Events in Tokyo
Professional wrestling in Tokyo